Tepalcatepec, also known as Tepeque, is a city and municipality in the state of Michoacán, Mexico, in the southwestern Tierra Caliente region of the state. The municipality borders the state of Jalisco to the north and west.

Population
The total population of Tepalcatepec in 2010 was 34,568, and the total population of the municipality was 42,879.

Gun battle 
Maria Guadalupe Lopez Esquival "La Catina", 21, leader of the Jalisco New Generation Cartel (CJNG) in Tepalcatepec, Michoacan was killed in a gun battle with state and federal security forces in the area in January 2020.

Fauna
The Michoacán club-tail iguana (Ctenosaura clarki) is endemic to Tepalcatepec. The habitat of this species is dry, hot, cactus-covered rocky hillsides.

References

Populated places in Michoacán